NYPD Blue is an American police procedural drama television series set in New York City, exploring the struggles of the fictional 15th Precinct detective squad in Manhattan. Each episode typically intertwines several plots involving an ensemble cast.

The series was originally broadcast on the ABC network, debuted on September 21, 1993‚ and aired its final episode on March 1, 2005.  It was ABC's longest-running primetime one-hour drama series until Grey's Anatomy surpassed it in 2016.

Series overview

Episodes

Season 1 (1993–94)

Season 2 (1994–95)

Season 3 (1995–96)

Season 4 (1996–97)

Season 5 (1997–98)

Season 6 (1998–99)

Season 7 (2000)

Season 8 (2001)

Season 9 (2001–02)

Season 10 (2002–03)

Season 11 (2003–04)

Season 12 (2004–05)

Ratings

Home video releases

References

Lists of American crime drama television series episodes